George Aitchison (19 October 1864 – 25 January 1895) was a Scotland international rugby union player. He played as a halfback.

Rugby Union career

Amateur career

Aitchison played for Edinburgh Wanderers, one of the top teams in Scotland at the time.

Provincial career

He was called up for the Edinburgh District side for the 1882 provincial match against Glasgow District on 2 December 1882.

International career

He was called up to the Scotland squad for the Home Nations Championship and played Ireland at Belfast on 17 February 1883.

References

1864 births
1895 deaths
Rugby union players from Edinburgh
Scottish rugby union players
Scotland international rugby union players
Edinburgh Wanderers RFC players
Edinburgh District (rugby union) players